Shaheen Ali (Arabic:شاهين علي) (born 15 June 1983) is a Qatari footballer. He currently plays as a right back .

References

External links
 

Qatari footballers
1983 births
Living people
Al Ahli SC (Doha) players
Al-Gharafa SC players
Al-Sailiya SC players
Qatar SC players
Muaither SC players
Qatar Stars League players
Qatari Second Division players
Association football fullbacks